Irene Baldessari (born 18 January 1993) is an Italian middle-distance runner who won two national titles at senior level.

Biography
At international youth level she won gold medal at the 2014 Mediterranean Athletics U23 Championships.

Achievements

National titles
Italian Athletics Championships
800 m: 2018
Italian Athletics Indoor Championships
800 m: 2017

References

External links
 

1993 births
Living people
Italian female middle-distance runners
Athletics competitors of Gruppo Sportivo Esercito
Sportspeople from Trento
Athletes (track and field) at the 2019 European Games
European Games medalists in athletics
European Games bronze medalists for Italy
20th-century Italian women
21st-century Italian women